The Parish Church of Saint Nicholas, also known as St Nicholas' Cardonald, is a 20th century Parish church of the Church of Scotland, located in the Hillington and Cardonald areas of Glasgow.

History of the Building and Congregation
St Nicholas' was designed by James Miller, and built in the 1930s. It was built of bricks, with pillars and round arches. It was completed in 1937, and was dedicated on 25 November 1937. Initially, church membership low, but by 1947, membership amounted to over a thousand, and by 1962 to nearly two thousand.

In 2015, the congregations of Penilee St Andrew and St Nicholas' united to form one parish named St Andrew and St Nicholas, with both churches still in use.

References

Churches completed in 1937
Nicholas